This is a list of math rock groups:

# 
31Knots
5th PROJEKT
65daysofstatic
90 Day Men

A 
Acidman
Adebisi Shank
Agent Fresco
Ahleuchatistas
Algernon Cadwallader
Alpha Male Tea Party
American Football
aMiniature
And So I Watch You From Afar
Arcane Roots
Autoclave
Autolux

B 
Battles
Bats
Because of Ghosts
Bellini
Black Midi
Black Pus
Blakfish
Blind Idiot God
Botch
Braid
Breadwinner
By the End of Tonight

C 
The Cancer Conspiracy
Canvas Solaris
The Cast of Cheers
Chavez
Cheer-Accident
Chochukmo
Chon
Circus Lupus
Colossal
Colossamite
Converge
Covet
Crain
Craw
Crom-Tech
The Crownhate Ruin

D 
Dads
Damiera
Dance Club Massacre 
Dance Gavin Dance
Daughters
Dazzling Killmen
Death and the Penguin
Delta Sleep
Dianogah
The Dillinger Escape Plan
The Dismemberment Plan
Don Caballero
Drive Like Jehu
Dutch Uncles

E 
The Edmund Fitzgerald
El Ten Eleven
Elephant Gym
Empire! Empire! (I Was a Lonely Estate)
Enablers
The End
Enemies
Everyoned
Everything Everything
Extra Life

F 
The Fall of Troy
Fang Island
Faraquet
Fear Before
Fiasco
Foals
The Forms
¡Forward, Russia!
Foxing
The Fucking Champs

G 
Gatsby's American Dream
Gastr Del Sol
Ghosts and Vodka
Giraffes? Giraffes!
El Grupo Nuevo de Omar Rodriguez Lopez

H 
Hail the Sun
Heavy Vegetable
Hella
Zach Hill
Hot Club de Paris

I 
Icarus the Owl
If Lucy Fell

J 
Joan of Arc
Johnny Foreigner
June of 44

K 
Keelhaul
kimono
King Crimson

L 
Les Savy Fav
Ling tosite Sigure
Lite
Little Tybee
Look Mexico

M 
Macseal
Make Believe
Maps & Atlases
Marmozets
Marnie Stern
The Mars Volta
Maserati
Maybeshewill
Meet Me In St Louis
The Mercury Program
A Minor Forest
Minus the Bear
My Disco

N 
Nekropsi
Nomeansno
The Number Twelve Looks Like You

O 
Oceansize
Orthrelm
Owls
OXES
Origami Angel

P 
Pattern Is Movement
Paul Newman
Pele
Piglet
Pinback
PVT
Polvo
Protest the Hero
Public Relations Exercise
Polyphia

Q 
Q and Not U

R 
The Redneck Manifesto
Regulator Watts
Rhythm of Black Lines
Roadside Monument
Rodan
Rolo Tomassi

S 
Shake Ray Turbine
Sharks Keep Moving
Shellac
Shiner
Shipping News
Shorty
Sleeping People
Sleepytime Gorilla Museum
Slint
Snowing
So Many Dynamos
Speaking Canaries
Steve Albini 
Storm & Stress
Sweep the Leg Johnny

T 
Tabula Rasa
Tera Melos
That Fucking Tank
These Arms Are Snakes
Thingy
TTNG (This Town Needs Guns)
Three Trapped Tigers
Time of Orchids
Tiny Moving Parts
Toe
Tom's Story
Tommy Alto
Tricot
Tubelord
Turing Machine

U 
U.S. Maple
Ui
Unwound
Upsilon Acrux
Uzeda

V 
Vessels
Viet Cong

W 
We Are the Music Makers
We Be the Echo
We Versus The Shark

Y 
Yona-Kit
Yowie
Yourcodenameis:Milo
Youthmovies
Yukon

Z 
Zazen Boys
Zeus!
Zu

See also 
 List of mathcore bands

References

Math rock
 
Math rock